Nadiapur railway station is located at  Nadiapur in Tripura, India. It is an Indian railway station of the Lumding–Sabroom line in the Northeast Frontier Railway zone of Indian Railways. The station is situated at  Nadiapur in  North Tripura district in the Indian state of Tripura. Total 4 Passengers trains halt in the station.

History
Nadiapur railway station became operation in 2008 with the meter gauge line from Lumding to Agartala but later in 2016 entire section converted into broad-gauge line.

Details 
The station lies on the 312 km long  broad-gauge Lumding–Sabroom railway line which comes under the Lumding railway division of the Northeast Frontier Railway zone of Indian Railways. It is a single line without electrification.

Services 
 1 trains per day run between Dharmanagar and Silchar. The train stops at Nadiapur station.
 1 trains per day run between Agartala and Silchar. The train stops at Nadiapur station.

Station

Station layout

Platforms 
There are a total of 1 platforms and 1 tracks.

References

External links
 Indian Railways site
 Indian railway fan club

Railway stations in West Tripura district
Railway stations opened in 2008
Lumding railway division